The 1966–67 Huddersfield Town season was a mainly successful season for the Town. Town finished the season in 6th place under Tom Johnston.

Squad at the start of the season

Review
Tom Johnston tried to improve on the previous season's 4th place in the league. Their start was mixed with around as many wins as losses. The mid-part of the season saw Town go on an impressive run of only 2 defeats in 18 league games between November and mid-March. The end of the season saw a slight drop in form which more or less lost Town's chances of gaining promotion to Division 1. The rise up the table was helped by the goals of Colin Dobson and Tony Leighton, who scored 35 league goals between them.

They finished in 6th place with 49 points, 9 points behind 2nd placed Wolverhampton Wanderers.

Squad at the end of the season

Results

Division Two

FA Cup

Football League Cup

Appearances and goals

1966-67
English football clubs 1966–67 season